Anna Espar Llaquet (born 8 January 1993) is a Spanish water polo player who won the gold medal at the 2013 World Championships in Barcelona. She also won the silver medal at the 2012 and 2020 Summer Olympics.

College career
Espar joined the University of Southern California women's water polo team in 2012. As a Freshman she was named to the ACWPC All-America First Team, All-MPSF First Team, MPSF All-Newcomer Team and MPSF Player of the Week on 25 February after scoring 8 goals in her first major tournament as a Trojan.

In 2013, she won the NCAA in the longest match in championship game history. Espar scored the winning goal in the third sudden-death overtime period.

International career 
Espar played on the Spain national team which won the silver medal at the 2012 Summer Olympics in London. She scored 15 goals and was named to the Olympic All-Star Team.

In 2012 Espar was named Best European Female Water Polo Player by the LEN.

Espar joined the Sidney Uni Lions women's water polo team in 2017 winning the Australian League and ending with an unprecedented undefeated season for the Lions (23 wins and a draw in 24 matches). Espar was also named to the 2017 NWPL All Star Team.

Espar also played on the Spanish national team which won the silver at the 2020 Summer Olympics in Tokyo. She scored again 15 goals and was named to the Olympic All-Star Team for the second time in her career.

Family
Espar's younger sister, Clara, is also a professional water polo player.

International competitions
 2011 FINA Junior World Championships, Trieste, Italy, 1st place.
 2012 Olympic Games, London, United Kingdom, 2nd place.
 2013 FINA World Championships, Barcelona, Spain, 1st place.
 2013 FINA Junior World Championships, Volos, Greece, 2nd place.
 2014 European Championship, Budapest, Hungary. 1st place.
 2014 FINA World Cup, Khanty-Mansiysk, Russia, 3rd place.
 2016 FINA World League, Shanghai, China, 2nd place.
 2017 FINA World Championships, Budapest, Hungary, 2nd place.
 2018 LEN Europa Cup, Pontevedra, Spain, 3rd place.
 2018 Mediterranean Games, Tarragona, Spain, 1st place.
 2018 European Championship, Barcelona, Spain, 3rd place.
 2019 FINA World Championships, Gwangju, South Korea, 2nd place.
 2020 European Championship, Budapest, Hungary. 1st place.
 2020 Olympic Games, Tokyo, Japan, 2nd place.

See also
 Spain women's Olympic water polo team records and statistics
 List of Olympic medalists in water polo (women)
 List of women's Olympic water polo tournament top goalscorers
 List of world champions in women's water polo
 List of World Aquatics Championships medalists in water polo

References

External links

 
 

1993 births
Living people
Water polo players from Barcelona
Spanish female water polo players
Water polo drivers
Water polo players at the 2012 Summer Olympics
Water polo players at the 2016 Summer Olympics
Water polo players at the 2020 Summer Olympics
Medalists at the 2012 Summer Olympics
Medalists at the 2020 Summer Olympics
Olympic silver medalists for Spain in water polo
World Aquatics Championships medalists in water polo
Competitors at the 2018 Mediterranean Games
Mediterranean Games medalists in water polo
Mediterranean Games gold medalists for Spain
21st-century Spanish women
Sportswomen from Catalonia